Intimate Strangers is a 2018 South Korean comedy-drama film directed by Lee Jae-kyoo and written by Bae Se-young, based on the 2016 Italian film Perfect Strangers. It features an ensemble cast that includes Yoo Hae-jin, Cho Jin-woong, Lee Seo-jin, Yum Jung-ah, Kim Ji-soo, Song Ha-yoon and Yoon Kyung-ho. The film was released in South Korea on 31 October 2018.

It is a remake of the 2016 Paolo Genovese film Perfect Strangers (Italian: Perfetti sconosciuti), one of several remakes of this film.

Plot summary
Lifelong friends and married couple Seok-ho and Ye-jin, invite their close friends over for a housewarming dinner. They end up playing a game where they must share all new incoming messages and calls of their cell phones. Initially starting off lightly, the game gets more and more uncomfortable as hidden truths start to surface, making them start to feel more like strangers.

Cast

Main

Yoo Hae-jin as Tae-soo
Cho Jin-woong as Seok-ho
Lee Seo-jin as Joon-mo
Yum Jung-ah as Soo-hyun, Tae-soo's wife
Kim Ji-soo as Ye-jin, Seok-ho's wife
Song Ha-yoon as Se-kyung, Joon-mo's wife
Yoon Kyung-ho as Young-bae

Supporting
Ji Woo as So-young, Seok-ho and Ye-jin's daughter

Special appearances

Lee Soon-jae as Young-bae's father (voice)
Ra Mi-ran as Kim So-wol (voice)
Jo Jung-suk as Yeon-woo (voice)
Kim Min-kyo as Min-soo (voice)
Jo Dal-hwan as Det. Kang Kyung-joon (voice)
Lee Do-kyung as Ye-jin's father (voice)
Jin Seon-kyu as Facebook's guy (voice)
Choi Yu-hwa as Chae-young (voice)
Jung Suk-young as Joon-mo's friend (voice)

Production
Principal photography began on 27 December 2017, and concluded on 12 February 2018.

Release
Intimate Strangers was released on 31 October 2018, alongside Hollywood films Bohemian Rhapsody, Halloween and The House with a Clock in Its Walls. On 6 November 2018, the film was reported to have been sold to 44 territories, with release date in Australia and New Zealand on 8 November, the United States on 9 November, and Singapore on 22 November.

Reception

Critical response
Yoon Min-sik from The Korea Herald gave a mixed review and wrote, "Though it starts off dull, the film quickly heats up -- both in terms of fun and drama. This is largely due to quality acting from most of the cast. The mundane lines seemed generic, and the characters were stereotypical. However, these were small problems compared with how the film ended, which left me feeling confused about how I felt about the film."

Box office
The film topped the local box office during its opening day, attracted 273,972 attendance with  gross, the biggest opening day for a 2018 comedy. On 3 November, the film surpassed 1 million admissions, fastest comedy to hit the milestone in 2018. The film surpassed its break-even point at 1.8 million admissions on 5 November.

During its opening weekend, the film topped local box office with  gross from 1,173,171 attendance, leaving Bohemian Rhapsody in second place. It is second biggest opening weekend for a local 2018 film, behind Along with the Gods: The Last 49 Days. On 6 November, the film surpassed 2 million admissions, becoming the third fastest local 2018 film to surpass the milestone.

As of 30 December 2018, the film grossed  from 5,292,649 total attendance.

See also
Perfect Strangers (2017), Spanish remake of Perfect Strangers
Nothing to Hide (2018), French remake of Perfect Strangers
Loud Connection (2019), Russian remake of Perfect Strangers

References

External links
 
 
 Intimate Strangers at Naver
 Intimate Strangers at Daum

2018 films
2010s Korean-language films
2018 comedy-drama films
South Korean comedy-drama films
Films set in Seoul
South Korean remakes of foreign films
Lotte Entertainment films
Remakes of Italian films
2010s South Korean films